Fântânele River may refer to:

 Fântânele, a tributary of the Sebeș in Brașov County
 Fântânele, a tributary of the Sibișel in Hunedoara County

See also 
 Fântânele (disambiguation)
 Fântâna River (disambiguation)